The men's triple jump event at the 1963 Summer Universiade was held at the Estádio Olímpico Monumental in Porto Alegre on 7 September 1963.

Results

References

Athletics at the 1963 Summer Universiade
1963